Hudson High School is a high school in Hudson, New York, United States. It is operated by the Hudson City School District.

Awards
In 2007 Hudson High School won the state cleanliness award for cleanest high school.

References

External links
 

Public high schools in New York (state)
Schools in Columbia County, New York